Roland Redmond Griffiths (born 1946) is an American psychopharmacologist. He is professor of neuroscience, psychiatry, and behavioral science, and director of the Center for Psychedelic and Consciousness Research at Johns Hopkins University School of Medicine. Griffiths is credited with helping to revive interest in clinical research with psychedelic drugs in the late 2000s as a potential treatment for addiction, depression, and anxiety.

References

Further reading
 Scharper, Julie (Fall 2017). "Crash Course in the Nature of the Mind". Johns Hopkins Magazine. Retrieved February 15, 2020.

External links
 Roland R. Griffiths, PhD, at Johns Hopkins University School of Medicine
 Roland R. Griffiths, PhD at the Center for Psychedelic & Consciousness Research

Living people
American neuroscientists
American psychiatrists
Psychedelic drug researchers
Psychopharmacologists
1946 births